Queens of Clubs Trilogy: Diamond Edition is a remix album by Libyan-born American singer-songwriter Nadia Ali. The Diamond Edition is the final installment in Ali's three-part compilation, Queen of Clubs Trilogy: The Best of Nadia Ali Remixed. The album was released on December 20, 2010 by Smile in Bed Records.

Track listing

Credits
Track 2: Collaboration with Sultan & Ned Shepard
Track 9: Collaboration with Armin van Buuren

References

External links
Queen of Clubs Trilogy: Diamond Edition at Amazon

2010 compilation albums
Nadia Ali (singer) albums